Ayo Edebiri (born October 3, 1995) is an American comedian, writer, producer and actress. She appeared on Comedy Central's Up Next and co-hosts the podcast Iconography with Olivia Craighead. Edebiri is best known as a voice actor on Big Mouth (2020–present) and a main cast member on The Bear (2022–present).

Early life and education 
Edebiri was born in Boston and raised in a religious Pentecostal household. Her mother emigrated from Barbados and her father emigrated from Nigeria. She first became interested in comedy through eighth grade drama class, after which she joined the improv club at Boston Latin School.

Edebiri attended New York University, where she received her bachelor's degree in teaching. As a junior in college, she began preparing to pursue a career in comedy and interned at Upright Citizens Brigade.

Career

Film and television 
Edebiri is a stand-up comedian, and performed a stand-up set on Comedy Central's Up Next. Her scripted digital series Ayo and Rachel Are Single began airing on the network in May 2020, which she co-wrote and costarred in with her friend and fellow comedienne Rachel Sennott.

She is a television writer, and wrote for the sole seasons of The Rundown with Robin Thede and NBC's Sunnyside. Edebiri joined the writing staff of Big Mouth for the show's fourth season. After Jenny Slate stepped down from voicing the character Missy so the role could be played by a black actress, Edebiri auditioned and was selected as the replacement in August 2020. Her voice acting as the character began at the end of the show's fourth season. Edebiri was a writer and actress in Dickinson's second season on Apple TV+. She acted in a supporting role in the upcoming film adaptation of the Jennifer E. Smith YA novel Hello, Goodbye and Everything in Between.

In 2022 Edebiri gained wider prominence as a main cast member on the FX on Hulu comedy series The Bear. She received an Independent Spirit Award and nominations from the Gotham Awards and the Critics' Choice Awards for her performance as Sydney Adamu, an ambitious young sous chef.

Her upcoming projects include co-producing and writing for Mulligan, an animated series for Netflix, on January 26, 2023 she joins the Marvel Cinematic Universe in the 2024 film Thunderbolts in an undisclosed role and voicing the lead role in the animated series We Lost Our Human, also for Netflix.

Other work 
Edebiri co-hosts a podcast called Iconography with Olivia Craighead that features interviews with guests in conversation about their shared personal icons. The podcast is produced by Forever Dog and the second season was released in 2020.

She has canvassed for the Democratic Socialists of America.

Filmography

Film

Television

Awards and nominations

References

External links 
 
 Ayo Edebiri on Twitter

1995 births
Living people
21st-century American actresses
21st-century American women writers
American film actresses
American people of Barbadian descent
American people of Nigerian descent
American podcasters
American stand-up comedians
American television actresses
American television writers
American voice actresses
American women television producers
American women comedians
American women podcasters
Comedians from Massachusetts
Entertainers from Massachusetts
Members of the Democratic Socialists of America
New York University alumni